Live: The Journey is a live album released on October 18, 2011 by the American soul and gospel singer Shirley Murdock. The album peaked at #24 on Billboard's Top Gospel Albums charts.

Track listing

Personnel

Adapted from AllMusic

Shirley Murdock – lead vocals, musical arrangements
Regina Belle – backing vocals
Beverly Crawford – backing vocals
Kelly Price – backing vocals
Sheena Croutch – backing vocals
Sheria Croutch – backing vocals
Adrian Huntley – backing vocals
Marsha Jackson – backing vocals 
Mary Ann Kimble – backing vocals
Lejuene Thompson – backing vocals
Natasha Gray – backing vocals
Dennis Reed – choir director
Phillip Lassiter – conductor, horn Arrangements, trumpet
Evan Brice – keyboards
Ira Noise – organ
Reggie Graves – guitars
Sylvester Onyejiaka – saxophone
Reger "Ross" Smith – bass
Cedric "CJ" Thompson, Jr. – drums
Bryant S. Scott – coordination, executive producer
Leonard S. Scott – executive producer
Cedric Thompson – keyboards, producer, vocal arrangement
Steven Gamble – recording engineer
Mark Williams – recording engineer, Mixing
Tommy Martin – engineer
Marc McManeus – engineer
Jeff Murdock – assistant engineer
Robin Oliver – Art Direction
Arnold Greene – production coordination
Shaamora Harden – coordination
Melanie Scott – coordination, cover Design
Dave Harris – mastering

References

2011 live albums
Shirley Murdock albums
Live gospel albums